David Peacock (14 April 1924 – 11 January 2000), was a British theatre administrator.

Early life 
Peacock was born in England in 1924. He was the son of a civil servant father and a French mother. He was educated at the Douai School.

Career 
After serving in the British Armed Forces during World War II, he worked as the stage manager at the Royal Opera House. In 1964, he emigrated to Canada and was succeeded by Stella Chitty as general stage manager.

Peacock was director of the production course at the National Theatre School of Canada, and in 1970 became the school's general director. From 1972, he was in charge of the arts division of the Canada Council.

Personal life 
In 1951, Peacock married Georgia Thorndike, daughter of the actor and novelist Russell Thorndike and niece of the actress Sybil Thorndike, and they had seven children, including the actress Lucy Peacock. They divorced in 1978, he moved back to England, and remarried.

He died in London in 2000, aged 75.

References

1924 births
2000 deaths
Royal Opera House
British theatre managers and producers
Academic staff of the National Theatre School of Canada
20th-century British businesspeople